Die Bertinis is a novel by Ralph Giordano published in 1982. The book tells the story of a German-Italian family from the late 19th century until the end of the Second World War. It is heavily autobiographical, focusing largely on the life of Giordano and his experiences in Hamburg during the period of National Socialism.

Television series

Die Bertinis was made into a ZDF television series in 1988.

See also
 List of German television series

External links
 

1982 German novels
German historical novels
German autobiographical novels
Novels set in Hamburg
German novels adapted into television shows
1988 German television series debuts
1988 German television series endings
ZDF original programming
Television shows set in Hamburg
World War II television drama series
Television shows based on German novels
German-language television shows